The Under Secretary of Commerce for Intellectual Property, or USC(IP), is a senior official in the United States Department of Commerce and the principal advisor to the United States Secretary of Commerce on the intellectual property matters. In tandem, the Under Secretary  is also the Director of the United States Patent and Trademark Office within the Commerce Department, filling dual roles.

The Under Secretary is appointed by the President of the United States, with the consent of the United States Senate, to serve at the pleasure of the President. President Trump nominated Andrei Iancu to fill the position on August 25, 2017. He was confirmed on February 5, 2018, with a 94-0 vote. He left office on January 20, 2021.

Overview
As the Director of the United States Patent and Trademark Office, the Under Secretary is responsible for administering laws relevant to granting patents and trademarks, and for the daily management of the agency's budget and more than 8,000 employees. The Under Secretary is also obligated to conduct programs and studies regarding intellectual property, and to conduct cooperative programs with other foreign intellectual property offices.

The rank of Under Secretary is a Level III position within the Executive Schedule. In January 2010, the annual rate of pay for Level III is $165,300.

History
The position of Under Secretary and Director of the United States Patent Office was created by the Patent and Trademark Office Efficiency Act, which was signed into law by President Bill Clinton on November 29, 1999. It was made effective January 17, 2001, by Department of Commerce Department Organization Order (DOO) no. 10-14. The DOO abolished the position's predecessor, the Assistant Secretary of Commerce and Commissioner of Patents and Trademarks. The act mandated the creation of the Deputy Under Secretary and Deputy Director, who assist the Under Secretary, as well as other aspects of the reorganization of the office as a federal agency.

Reporting officials
Officials reporting to the USC(IP)/Director include:
Deputy Under Secretary of Commerce for Intellectual Property/Deputy Director of the Patent and Trademark Office
Commissioner of Patents
Commissioner of Trademarks

Officeholders

Kathi Vidal currently serves as Under Secretary of Commerce for Intellectual Property, assuming the role in 2022. Andrei Iancu served as Under Secretary of Commerce for Intellectual Property from 2017 to 2021. Michelle Lee was Under Secretary of Commerce for Intellectual Property from 2014 to 2017, with Joseph Matal and Teresa Stanek Rea serving as Acting USC(IP)s before and after, respectively. Lee was succeeded by David Kappos. Prior, John Doll was Acting Under Secretary, after replacing Jon Dudas, who resigned on January 20, 2009. Dudas had been appointed by President George W. Bush in July 2004, and had served as acting Under Secretary since 2002. Previous Under Secretaries include James E. Rogan and inaugural officeholder Q. Todd Dickinson.

See also
 List of people who have headed the United States Patent Office

References